Germaine Malépart (July 7, 1898 – April 19, 1963) was a Canadian pianist and music educator.

When she was 13, she performed for the Ladies' Morning Musical Club in Montreal. In 1917, she won the Prix d'Europe and, in 1920, she received a scholarship from the Ladies' Morning Musical Club. Malépart studied five years at the Conservatoire de Paris with Isidor Philipp, Maurice Amour and Roland Broche. After her return to Montreal, she toured throughout Canada and the United States and performed on radio.

In 1942, she began teaching at the École supérieure de musique d'Outremont and at the Conservatoire de musique du Québec à Montréal. Her students included Lise Boucher, Andrée Desautels, Pierre Hétu, François Morel, Renée Morisset, Claude Savard, William Stevens, Gilles Tremblay and Ronald Turini.

Malépart died in Montreal at the age of 64.

References 

1898 births
1963 deaths
Canadian classical pianists
Canadian women pianists
Canadian music educators
Musicians from Quebec
People from Laval, Quebec
20th-century classical pianists
Women music educators
Women classical pianists
20th-century Canadian pianists
20th-century Canadian women musicians
20th-century women pianists